Loyal Eugene Carlson (February 20, 1932 – June 1, 2009) was an American football and baseball player and coach. He served as the head football coach at his alma mater, the University of Montana in Missoula, from 1976 to 1979.

Head coaching record

College

References

External links
 
 1979 Montana Grizzlies football media guide – Gene Carlson
 

1932 births
2009 deaths
Boise Yankees players
Modesto Reds players
Missoula Timberjacks players
Montana Grizzlies baseball players
Montana Grizzlies football coaches
Montana Grizzlies football players
Peoria Chiefs players
High school football coaches in Montana
People from Fort Benton, Montana
Players of American football from Montana
Baseball players from Montana